The discography of American rapper, singer, and record producer Missy Elliott consists of six studio albums, three compilation albums, one extended play, seventy-four singles (including forty-four as a featured performer) and twenty solo music videos.

Albums

Studio albums

Compilation albums

Box sets

Extended plays

Singles

As lead artist

As featured artist

Promotional singles

Other charted songs

Guest appearances

Music videos

Notes 

A  Two single versions of "All n My Grill" were released: the first features MC Solaar, and the second features Big Boi.
B  "Ya Di Ya" did not enter the Billboard Hot 100, but peaked at number 24 on the Bubbling Under Hot 100 Singles chart, which acts as a 25-song extension to the Hot 100.
C  "Turn da Lights Off" did not enter the Billboard Hot 100, but peaked at number 8 on the Bubbling Under Hot 100 Singles chart, which acts as a 25-song extension to the Hot 100.
D  "Bad Girl" did not enter the Billboard Hot 100, but peaked at number 10 on the Bubbling Under Hot 100 Singles chart, which acts as a 25-song extension to the Hot 100.
E  "Whatcha Think About That" did not enter the Billboard Hot 100, but peaked at number 8 on the Bubbling Under Hot 100 Singles chart, which acts as a 25-song extension to the Hot 100.
F  "Funky Fresh Dressed" did not enter the Hot R&B/Hip-Hop Songs chart, but peaked at number 8 on the Bubbling Under R&B/Hip-Hop Singles chart, which acts as a 25-song extension to the Hot R&B/Hip-Hop Songs chart.
G  "(When Kim Say) Can You Hear Me Now?" did not enter the Hot R&B/Hip-Hop Songs chart, but peaked at number 1 on the Bubbling Under R&B/Hip-Hop Singles chart, which acts as a 25-song extension to the Hot R&B/Hip-Hop Songs chart.
H  "Wake Up" did not enter the Hot R&B/Hip-Hop Songs chart, but peaked at number 20 on the Bubbling Under R&B/Hip-Hop Singles chart, which acts as a 25-song extension to the Hot R&B/Hip-Hop Songs chart.
I  "Wake Up Everybody" did not enter the Hot R&B/Hip-Hop Songs chart, but peaked at number 19 on the Bubbling Under R&B/Hip-Hop Singles chart, which acts as a 25-song extension to the Hot R&B/Hip-Hop Songs chart.
J  "Where Could He Be" did not enter the Hot R&B/Hip-Hop Songs chart, but peaked at number 20 on the Bubbling Under R&B/Hip-Hop Singles chart, which acts as a 25-song extension to the Hot R&B/Hip-Hop Songs chart.
K  "On and On" did not enter the Hot R&B/Hip-Hop Songs chart, but peaked at number 9 on the Bubbling Under R&B/Hip-Hop Singles chart, which acts as a 25-song extension to the Hot R&B/Hip-Hop Songs chart.
L  "All Night Long" did not enter the Billboard Hot 100, but peaked at number 24 on the Bubbling Under Hot 100 Singles chart, which acts as a 25-song extension to the Hot 100.
M  "Ching-a-Ling" did not enter the Ultratop 50, but peaked at number 20 on the Flemish Ultratip chart.
N  "WTF (Where They From)" did not enter the Ultratop 50, but peaked at number 15 on the Flemish Ultratip chart.
O  "Burnitup!" did not enter the Hot R&B/Hip-Hop Songs chart, but peaked at number 3 on the Bubbling Under R&B/Hip-Hop Singles chart, which acts as a 25-song extension to the Hot R&B/Hip-Hop Songs chart.
P  "Burnitup!" did not enter the Ultratop 50, but peaked at number 68 on the Flemish Ultratip chart.

Notes

References

External links
 

Hip hop discographies
Discographies of American artists
Discography